The Orphans of Nkandla is a 2004 documentary film about AIDS orphans in the South African town of Nkandla, produced and directed by Brian Woods and Deborah Shipley.

The film won the Flaherty Award for Best Single Documentary at the 2005 British Academy Television Awards.

References

External links

HIV/AIDS in South Africa
2004 documentary films
2004 films
Documentary films about HIV/AIDS
Documentary films about South Africa
Films about orphans
BAFTA winners (films)
British documentary films
Films shot in KwaZulu-Natal
HIV/AIDS in British films
2000s British films